Invasión is an Argentine film released in 1969 and directed by Hugo Santiago, who had also written the script together with Jorge Luis Borges and Adolfo Bioy Casares. Its style is intermediate between classic cinema and the French nouvelle vague.

In a survey of the 100 greatest films of Argentine cinema carried out by the Museo del Cine Pablo Ducrós Hicken in 2000, the film reached the 38th position. In a new version of the survey organized in 2022 by the specialized magazines La vida útil, Taipei and La tierra quema, presented at the Mar del Plata International Film Festival, the film reached the 2nd position.

Plot
A group of men commanded by an older man attempts to stop an invasion to the city of Aquilea.
The invaders are met by common men who defend the city, ignored by the people in general, but with the development of the film it is understood that the invasion is absolute and impossible to define. The defeat of the defenders is evident from the beginning, as in the "Trojan War."

Characters
 Don Porfirio, played by Juan Carlos Paz: He is the head of the defenders. He calls one by one, giving them the instructions, but he also has other plans.
 Julián Herrera, played by Lautaro Murúa: Commands the men who fight the invaders. Flat Hero, without visible emotions, almost the prototype of the Borgean compadrito.
 Irene, played by Olga Zubarry: Herrera's wife, has a double life, and the discovery of this double life was the final surprise of the film.

Production

Part of the film was shot in the Boca Juniors stadium.

History
Some negative rolls were lost during the Argentine dictatorship of 1976–1983.
The film was restored in France in the 1990s using the surviving negatives and lower-quality positives.

Invasión was premiered at the Cannes International Film Festival during the first Directors Fortnight and won an award later in 1969 at the Locarno International Film Festival.

Connections

 The city: The story speaks of Buenos Aires, calling it Aquilea.
 El Eternauta: The invaders arrive to Buenos Aires, defended by a dispersed group, that knows that the defense is impossible, and the final victory of the invaders by their large number was used in the comic strip El Eternauta of Héctor Germán Oesterheld of 1957.
 The Trojan War: The epic of the defeated begins to Iliad.

See also
 Alphaville, a New Wave black-and-white film featuring men in trench-coats traveling around a city.

References

External links 

 
Invasión on "The Garden of Forking Paths" Borges site.
 DVD version 
 
 in czech
 in spanish (critica)
 in english

1960s avant-garde and experimental films
1969 films
Dystopian films
Argentine independent films
Political drama films
1960s Spanish-language films
Films directed by Hugo Santiago
Films shot in Buenos Aires